Benoît Paire was the defending champion, but chose to compete in Hamburg instead.

Albert Ramos Viñolas won his first ATP title, defeating Fernando Verdasco in the final, 6–3, 6–4.

Seeds
The top four seeds receive a bye into the second round.

Draw

Finals

Top half

Bottom half

Qualifying

Seeds

Qualifiers

Qualifying draw

First qualifier

Second qualifier

Third qualifier

Fourth qualifier

External Links
 Main draw
 Qualifying draw

Swedish Open - Singles
2016 Men's Singles